Jaime Rafael Díaz Ochoa (born 14 August 1956) is a Mexican politician affiliated with the PAN. As of 2013 he served as Senator of the LX and LXI Legislatures of the Mexican Congress representing Baja California.

On 1 December 2013 Díaz took office as new Municipal President of Mexicali.

See also
 List of presidents of Mexicali Municipality

References

1956 births
Living people
People from Mexicali
Members of the Senate of the Republic (Mexico)
National Action Party (Mexico) politicians
21st-century Mexican politicians
Municipal presidents of Mexicali
Politicians from Baja California